Cunningham Ncube (born 17 April 1990) is a Zimbabwean cricketer. He made his first-class debut for Westerns in the 2007–08 Logan Cup on 17 May 2008. He made his Twenty20 debut for Matabeleland Tuskers in the 2018–19 Stanbic Bank 20 Series on 12 March 2019. In December 2020, he was selected to play for the Tuskers in the 2020–21 Logan Cup. His fielding position is the Wicket-keeper and he bats right handed in almost all of his games. He is infamous for his ownership and maturity on the field.

References

External links
 

1990 births
Living people
Zimbabwean cricketers
Place of birth missing (living people)
Matabeleland Tuskers cricketers
Mountaineers cricketers
Westerns (Zimbabwe) cricketers